Michael H.-J. Lips (born 7 May 1967) is a Swiss curler. At the international level, he is a 1991 European Curling Championships bronze medallist. At the national level, he is a 1988 Swiss men's champion curler.

Teams

References

External links

1967 births
Living people
Swiss male curlers
Swiss curling champions
Sportspeople from Zürich